Maharaja Sir Yadavindra Singh  was the 9th and last ruling Maharaja of Patiala from 1938 to 1971. He was also an Indian cricketer who played in one Test in 1934.

Early life and family

Born at Patiala City in Patiala State, within the British Raj (now in Punjab, India) in 1914 into a Sikh Jat family of the Sidhu clan, Maharaja Yadavindra attended Aitchison College in Lahore. He served in the Patiala State Police, became its Inspector General and served in Malaya, Italy and Burma during the Second World War. In 1935, he married his first wife, Hem Prabha Devi of Saraikela State (1913–2014).

He succeeded his father, Maharaja Bhupinder Singh, as the Maharaja of Patiala on 23 March 1938 and subsequently married his second wife, Mehtab Kaur (1922–2017), in 1938. Although the stated reason for his second marriage was that it was due to his first wife being issueless, it was believed that the actual reason was the influences of Akali leaders who wanted the future Maharaja of Patiala to marry a woman from a Jat Sikh family in order to beget genuine Sikh heirs.

Political career 

Yadavindra served as president of the Indian Olympic Association from 1938 to 1960. He was instrumental in organizing the Asian Games. He was a noted horticulturist by passion and later served as chairman of Indian Horticulture Development Council. He was also the president of BCCI.

Following his accession to the throne of Patiala, Yadavindra pursued a political and diplomatic career, serving as chancellor of the Chamber of Princes from 1943 to 1944. In 1947, when India gained independence, he was the pro-chancellor of the Chamber of Princes. At a special session he said "After centuries time has come when India has gained independence from foreign rule and it's the time when we all (princely states) should unite for our motherland" and persuaded many other rulers to join India.

Partition (1947) 

During the Partition of India numerous pogroms occurred in and around the princely state of Patiala. In several cases, organized bands of Sikhs were responsible for atrocities. The late Harkishan Singh Surjeet, of the Communist Party of India (Marxist), witnessed the events and claimed in an interview: ‘The communal attacks on the minorities were definitely planned. I know more about the persons involved in the eastern wing because I was there. I saw those dreadful acts with my own eyes. In that conspiracy, the Maharaja of Patiala was involved. The idea was that if the Muslims were driven out.' The attacks on Sikhs and Hindus in March 1947 in Rawalpindi are regarded as one of the major crimes that triggered off others. Nehru believed the Maharaja had sought to ethnically cleanse the territory of Muslims as part of this effort. Maharajas of Patiala and Faridkot, and Yadavindra Singh is quoted as having said "We won't leave a Muslim here" at a party with British officers. The Foreign Minister of Patiala, Sardar Bari Ram Sharma issued a denial stating "I definitely assert that no Patiala soldier has associated himself with or has been involved in any killings in any part of the East Punjab."

He agreed to the incorporation of the princely state into India on 5 May 1948. He was Rajpramukh of the new Indian state of Patiala and East Punjab States Union until it was merged with Punjab in 1956.

Donation 

In 1956, Sir Yadavindra Singh donated the Anand Bhawan, a 150 bigha palace, to the Government of Punjab (before the creation of Himachal) for a holiday home for poor children, which was later leased out to Baba Ramdev for his Patanjali Trust.

He founded Yadavindra Public School. Lal Bagh Palace, the building in which Yadavindra Public School is housed was donated by Sir Yadavindra Singh. The Yadavindra Public School, Mohali is also named after him and was established by the members of his family.

Later life and death

He continued his career from 1956 onwards, serving as Indian delegate to the United Nations General Assembly from 1956 to 1957 and to UNESCO in 1958. He also headed the Indian delegation to the FAO on and off during 1959–1969. Sir Yadavindra served as Indian Ambassador to Italy (1965–1966) and as Indian Ambassador to the Netherlands from 1971 until 17 June 1974, when he died suddenly in office at The Hague from heart failure, age 60. On specific instructions of Indira Gandhi, he was cremated with full state honours.

He was succeeded as family head by his son Captain Amarinder Singh, who is a politician with the formerly Congress now in Bhartiya Janata Party and who served as Chief Minister of the Indian State of Punjab from 2002 to 2007 and again starting in 2017 to 2021. His daughter, Heminder Kaur, was married to K. Natwar Singh, the former external affairs minister of India.

Titles

1913-1935: Sri Yuvaraja Yadavindra Singh Sahib-ji
1935-1938: Lieutenant Sri Yuvaraja Yadavindra Singh Sahib-ji
1938-1939: Lieutenant His Highness Farzand-i-Khas-i-Daulat-i-Inglishia, Mansur-i-Zaman, Amir ul-Umara, Maharajadhiraja Raj Rajeshwar, 108 Sri Maharaja-i-Rajgan, Maharaja Yadavindra Singh, Mahendra Bahadur, Yadu Vansha Vatans Bhatti Kul Bushan, Maharaja of Patiala
1939-1942: Captain His Highness Farzand-i-Khas-i-Daulat-i-Inglishia, Mansur-i-Zaman, Amir ul-Umara, Maharajadhiraja Raj Rajeshwar, 108 Sri Maharaja-i-Rajgan, Maharaja Yadavindra Singh, Mahendra Bahadur, Yadu Vansha Vatans Bhatti Kul Bushan, Maharaja of Patiala
1942-1944: Major His Highness Farzand-i-Khas-i-Daulat-i-Inglishia, Mansur-i-Zaman, Amir ul-Umara, Maharajadhiraja Raj Rajeshwar, 108 Sri Maharaja-i-Rajgan, Maharaja Sir Yadavindra Singh, Mahendra Bahadur, Yadu Vansha Vatans Bhatti Kul Bushan, Maharaja of Patiala, GBE
1944-1945: Lieutenant-Colonel His Highness Farzand-i-Khas-i-Daulat-i-Inglishia, Mansur-i-Zaman, Amir ul-Umara, Maharajadhiraja Raj Rajeshwar, 108 Sri Maharaja-i-Rajgan, Maharaja Sir Yadavindra Singh, Mahendra Bahadur, Yadu Vansha Vatans Bhatti Kul Bushan, Maharaja of Patiala, GBE
1945-1946: Major-General His Highness Farzand-i-Khas-i-Daulat-i-Inglishia, Mansur-i-Zaman, Amir ul-Umara, Maharajadhiraja Raj Rajeshwar, 108 Sri Maharaja-i-Rajgan, Maharaja Sir Yadavindra Singh, Mahendra Bahadur, Yadu Vansha Vatans Bhatti Kul Bushan, Maharaja of Patiala, GBE
1946-1971: Lieutenant-General His Highness Farzand-i-Khas-i-Daulat-i-Inglishia, Mansur-i-Zaman, Amir ul-Umara, Maharajadhiraja Raj Rajeshwar, 108 Sri Maharaja-i-Rajgan, Maharaja Sir Yadavindra Singh, Mahendra Bahadur, Yadu Vansha Vatans Bhatti Kul Bushan, Maharaja of Patiala, GCIE, GBE
1971-1974: Lieutenant-General Sir Yadavindra Singh, GCIE, GBE

Honours

King George V Silver Jubilee Medal-1935
King George VI Coronation Medal-1937
Knight Grand Cross of the Order of the British Empire (GBE)-1942
1939-1945 Star-1945
Burma Star-1945
Africa Star-1945
Italy Star-1945
British War Medal-1945
India Service Medal-1945
Knight Grand Commander of the Order of the Indian Empire (GCIE)-1946
Indian Independence Medal-1947
Grand Cross of the Romanian order
Grand Cross of the Order of Merit of the Republic of Italy-1966

Gallery

References

External links
Yadavindra Singh on ESPNcricinfo

Genealogy of the rulers of Patiala
   1933 Film made by R.M. Wilson and M. Pemberton, Marriage of the Maharaj Kumar Yadavindra Singh of Patiala

Patiala, Yuvraj of
Patiala, Yuvraj of
Jat rulers
Patiala, Yuvraj of
People from Patiala
Indian Sikhs
Ambassadors of India to Italy
Ambassadors of India to the Netherlands
Knights Grand Commander of the Order of the Indian Empire
Indian Knights Grand Cross of the Order of the British Empire
Maharajas of Patiala
Indian cricketers
Patiala cricketers
Southern Punjab cricketers
Hindus cricketers
North Zone cricketers
Rajpramukhs
Cricketers from Patiala
Viceroy's XI cricketers
Indian sports executives and administrators